The 1980 Southern Miss Golden Eagles football team was an American football team that represented the University of Southern Mississippi as an independent during the 1980 NCAA Division I-A football season. In their sixth year under head coach Bobby Collins, the team compiled a 9–3 record.

Schedule

References

Southern Miss
Independence Bowl champion seasons
Southern Miss Golden Eagles football seasons
Southern Miss Golden Eagles football